Alberto Becerra Acco (born January 31, 1979) is a Mexican former football goalkeeper.

Career 
Becerra's first professional game was for Club América on 31 March 2000, in a game against Santos Laguna in the Verano 2000 season. After letting in 11 goals in 5 games that season, Becerra saw limited action over the next few years, and he made a total of 12 appearances for America in the Primera Division de Mexico.

Before the Clausura 2004 season, Becerra was transferred to Puebla, where he was reserve goalkeeper to Oscar Dautt.  He was in the Club America squad for the 2006 FIFA Club World Cup.

References

1979 births
Club Puebla players
Living people
Mexican footballers
Club América footballers
Association football goalkeepers